Kevin James Hector (born 2 November 1944 in Leeds) is an English former footballer who scored 268 goals from 662 appearances in the Football League playing for Bradford Park Avenue and Derby County. His 486 League appearances for Derby County is a club record. He also played in the North American Soccer League for the Vancouver Whitecaps, and was capped twice for England.

Career
After a successful start to his playing career in the lower leagues at Bradford Park Avenue, Tim Ward signed him for Derby County in 1966 and he was a key player in their success under the management of Brian Clough and Dave Mackay over the next few seasons, forming a formidable partnership with John O'Hare. Hector played for the Rams for a total of 12 years, during which time they won the Football League First Division championship twice (the first time in 1972 under Clough and the second time in 1975 under Mackay) and the Football League Second Division championship (in 1969), and reached the semi-finals of the European Cup, the FA Cup and the League Cup.

He left Derby for Vancouver Whitecaps and scored 15 goals for the Canadian outfit as they won the 1979 NASL title.

After his time in North America he rejoined Derby in the early 1980s.

He made a record 589 appearances for Derby in his two spells, 486 of which came in league games.

In season 1965–66, whilst playing for Bradford Park Avenue, he scored 44 league goals in a single 46-game league season plus 6 goals in the first 4 league games of the following season prior to his transfer to Derby.

Hector played twice for England, his debut coming as an 88th-minute substitute in the fateful World Cup qualifier against Poland at Wembley in October 1973, when England, needing victory to qualify, were held to a 1–1 draw. With his first touch of the ball, he nearly won the game for England as his header from a corner was cleared off the line.

References

Hector's Football League career stats
Hector's FA profile

1944 births
Living people
Footballers from Leeds
English footballers
England international footballers
English Football League players
Association football forwards
Bradford (Park Avenue) A.F.C. players
Derby County F.C. players
North American Soccer League (1968–1984) players
Vancouver Whitecaps (1974–1984) players
Burton Albion F.C. players
English Football League representative players
English expatriate footballers
Expatriate soccer players in Canada
English expatriate sportspeople in Canada
Boston United F.C. players
Shepshed Dynamo F.C. players
Gresley F.C. players
Belper Town F.C. players
Eastwood Town F.C. players
Heanor Town F.C. players